Alice Sportisse Gomez-Nadal (9 July 1909 - 3 June 1996) was a French-Algerian politician.

She was born in Sidi Lakhdar, Algeria (then known as Lavarande).  She represented the Algerian Communist Party (PCA) in the Constituent Assembly elected in 1945, in the Constituent Assembly elected in 1946 and in the National Assembly from 1946 to 1955.

References

1909 births
1996 deaths
People from Aïn Defla Province
People of French Algeria
Pieds-Noirs
Algerian Communist Party politicians
Members of the Constituent Assembly of France (1945)
Members of the Constituent Assembly of France (1946)
Deputies of the 1st National Assembly of the French Fourth Republic
Deputies of the 2nd National Assembly of the French Fourth Republic
20th-century French women politicians
20th-century Algerian women politicians
20th-century Algerian politicians